The 2016 UNOH 175 was the 17th stock car race of the 2016 NASCAR Camping World Truck Series, the first race of the Round of 8, and the 19th iteration of the event. The race was held on Saturday, September 24, 2016, in Loudon, New Hampshire, at New Hampshire Motor Speedway, a 1.058-mile (1.703 km) permanent oval shaped racetrack. The race took the scheduled 175 laps to complete. William Byron, driving for Kyle Busch Motorsports, pulled off a dominating performance, leading 161 laps and earning his sixth career NASCAR Camping World Truck Series win. He would also earn a spot in the next round of the playoffs. To fill out the podium, Christopher Bell, driving for Kyle Busch Motorsports, and Matt Crafton, driving for ThorSport Racing, would finish 2nd and 3rd, respectively.

Background 

New Hampshire Motor Speedway is a  oval speedway located in Loudon, New Hampshire, which has hosted NASCAR racing annually since 1990, as well as the longest-running motorcycle race in North America, the Loudon Classic. Nicknamed "The Magic Mile", the speedway is often converted into a  road course, which includes much of the oval.

The track was originally the site of Bryar Motorsports Park before being purchased and redeveloped by Bob Bahre. The track is currently one of eight major NASCAR tracks owned and operated by Speedway Motorsports.

Entry list 

 (R) denotes rookie driver.
 (i) denotes driver who is ineligible for series driver points.

Notes

Practice

First practice 
The first practice session was held on Friday, September 23, at 1:30 am EST, and would last for 55 minutes.

Final practice 
The final practice session was held on Friday, September 23, at 3:30 am EST, and would last for 55 minutes.

Qualifying 
Qualifying was held on Saturday, August 17, at 10:10 am EST. Since New Hampshire Motor Speedway is under 1.5 miles (2.4 km) in length, the qualifying system is a multi-car system that included three rounds. The first round was 15 minutes, where every driver would be able to set a lap within the 15 minutes. Then, the second round would consist of the fastest 24 cars in Round 1, and drivers would have 10 minutes to set a lap. Round 3 consisted of the fastest 12 drivers from Round 2, and the drivers would have 5 minutes to set a time. Whoever was fastest in Round 3 would win the pole. 

Full qualifying results

Race results

Notes

Standings after the race 

Drivers' Championship standings

Note: Only the first 8 positions are included for the driver standings.

References 

NASCAR races at New Hampshire Motor Speedway
September 2016 sports events in the United States
2016 in sports in New Hampshire